Oxynoemacheilus cyri, the Göle loach  or banded Kura loach, is a species of stone loach from the genus Oxynoemacheilus. It is endemic to the Kura drainage in northern Turkey where it is currently locally abundant. This species occurs in high mountain streams with fast flowing currents. The specific name derives from the classical name for the Kura, "Cyrus".

References

cyri
Taxa named by Lev Berg
Fish described in 1910